Aage Rou Jensen (24 September 1924 – 8 June 2009) was a Danish international footballer who played over 400 times for AGF. He was a reserve member of the Danish squad at the 1952 Summer Olympics. He later became manager of AGF.

References

External links

 Danish national team profile
 AGF Profile and pictures
 Profile - Peder I. Nielsen
 Danish Cup Final 1955
 Danish Cup Final 1957
 Danish Cup Final 1960

1924 births
2009 deaths
Danish football managers
Danish men's footballers
Denmark international footballers
Footballers at the 1952 Summer Olympics
Olympic footballers of Denmark
Footballers from Aarhus
Association football forwards